The 1960 VPI Gobblers football team represented the Virginia Polytechnic Institute in the 1960 NCAA University Division football season.

Schedule

Players
The following players were members of the 1960 football team according to the roster published in the 1961 edition of The Bugle, the Virginia Tech yearbook.

References

VPI
Virginia Tech Hokies football seasons
VPI Gobblers football